Toyo Suyemoto (January 14, 1916 – December 30, 2003) was a Japanese-American poet, memoirist, and librarian. Her memoir I Call to Remembrance: Toyo Suyemoto's Years of Internment was published posthumously in 2007 by Rutgers University Press. She was incarcerated due to her Japanese ancestry during World War II.

Biography
Toyo Suyemoto was born January 14, 1916, in Oroville, California. She was the daughter of Japanese immigrants, Tsutomu Howard Suyemoto and Mitsu Hyakusoku Suyemoto. She was raised in the Nihonmachi, or Japantown, of Sacramento, CA. She attended University of California, Berkeley where she majored in English and Latin. She married Iwao Kawakami, a Nisei journalist. The couple moved to Oakland, CA, where their son, Kay, was born in October 1941. 

After the bombing of Pearl Harbor on December 7, 1941, Toyo decided to rejoin her family in Berkeley, while Iwao moved to San Francisco for a job with a newspaper. The couple separated later that month, and Toyo took Kay with her to Berkeley. That spring, as part of the enforcement of Executive Order 9066, she and Kay were incarcerated at Tanforan Assembly Center. From there, Toyo and Kay, as well as her parents and siblings, were sent to Topaz Relocation Center, in Delta, UT. At Topaz, she taught English and Latin and worked in the library. She was friends with artist Miné Okubo and she also served on the staff of the camp's literary magazine. Several of her poems were published there. During that time, Iwao never visited his wife or son and the couple divorced after the war.

After the war, she moved with her parents to Cincinnati, Ohio. She worked in the libraries of the University of Cincinnati and the Cincinnati Art Museum. In 1958, her son Kay died of a disease contracted in the camp. She attended the University of Michigan to get her Masters of Library Science. In 1964, she began working for the Ohio State University Library. She retired in 1985. Although her poetry was not very well known, she published poems in publications including The Yale Review and Commonground. Poet Lawson Fusao Inada referred to her as "our major Camp Poet and Nikkei Poet Laureate". The Rutgers University Press published her memoir posthumously in 2007.

References

1916 births
2003 deaths
People from Oroville, California
Writers from Oakland, California
20th-century American poets
American women poets
20th-century American memoirists
American women memoirists
University of California, Berkeley alumni
University of Michigan School of Information alumni
University of Cincinnati people
Ohio State University people
American writers of Japanese descent
American women writers of Asian descent
Japanese-American internees
20th-century American women writers
Japanese-American culture
American librarians of Japanese descent
21st-century American women